Eteni Longondo (born 1964 or 1965, Kinshasa) is a Congolese doctor and politician. He is a Member of the UDPS, and a Minister of Health in the Sylvestre Ilunga government since September 2019.

Early life and education 
Born in 1964 or 1965 in Kinshasa, Eteni Longondo studied general medicine at the University of Kinshasa. He became a doctor for the DRC football team, then went to Swaziland to become a general practitioner. He then studied public health at University of Washington, and decided to stay in the US to work in the public health department of Seattle.

Longondo also worked in several international organizations during his career, such as World Vision, Mercy Corps, Samaritan's Purse, Save the Children and the United States Agency for International Development (USAID).

Political career 
In 2014, Eteni Longondo was appointed by Étienne Tshisekedi Deputy Secretary General of the Union for Democracy and Social Progress (UDPS) opposition party.

During the 2018 presidential election, he supported the candidacy of Félix Tshisekedi, who won the election.

Minister of Health

On August 26, 2019, Longondo was appointed Minister of Health within the Ilunga government, and took office on September 9, succeeding the interim minister Pierre Kangudia. When taking up his post, he announced that he wanted to strengthen the health system, solve the problem of the premium for doctors as well as want to put an end to the problem of fictitious workers.

As Minister of Health, he inherited the management of two major health crises: an Ebola epidemic, one of the most serious the country has known, as well as an epidemic of measles.

In October 2019, during a Russia-Africa summit in Sochi, he signed a cooperation agreement in the epidemiological field between the DRC and Russia with Anna Popova.

From March 2020, he manages the health crisis linked to the COVID-19 pandemic. Criticisms concerning the management of the resources allocated to the fight against the epidemic emerged in June 2020. Congolese microbiologist Jean-Jacques Muyembe of the INRB, which is in charge of the response, announced having received barely more than a million dollars, while the government had officially spent more than 27 million to fight against the epidemic. In a press release published on June 21, Eteni Longondo made public a report on the management of these funds by his ministry. The minister explained this delay by erroneous lists, which would have been inflated with the names of agents not participating in the response.

Accusations of embezzlement 
In July 2020, Longondo was accused of embezzlement. On July 3, the deputy PPRD François Nzekuye denounced, in a written question, the “catastrophic management” of the ministry, and accused Longondo of having set up a system of kickbacks. He also suspected him of having circulated expired drugs. Eteni Longondo promised to explain himself to the deputies if he is officially seized.

On July 7, a confidential report to the Prime Minister leaked on social networks, in which he was questioned by his vice-minister Albert M'Peti Biyombo (member of the FCC, pro-Kabila coalition). The latter denounced "mafia networks" within his ministry, which would have misappropriated the funds allocated to the fight against COVID-19, and accused the minister and other members of the government of bribery when awarding contracts. Jules Alingete Key, Inspector General of Finance, then launched an audit at the ministry. In response to these accusations, Eteni Longondo announced an intention to file a complaint against X for defamation. Doctors subsequently demonstrated to demand the resignation of the minister, accusing him of "embezzlement"

On August 27, 2021, Eteni Longondo was placed under a provisional arrest warrant, following a hearing at the public prosecutor's office at the Court of Cassation in Kinshasa.

On August 31, 2021, Eteni Logondo was released on bail during a hearing before the council chamber of the Kinshasa Gombe tribunal de grande instance. This was granted to him after a two-week deliberation.

References 

People from Kinshasa
Union for Democracy and Social Progress (Democratic Republic of the Congo) politicians
Living people
University of Washington School of Medicine alumni
Year of birth uncertain
21st-century Democratic Republic of the Congo people
Year of birth missing (living people)